
Gmina Olesno is an urban-rural gmina (administrative district) in Olesno County, Opole Voivodeship, in south-western Poland.

Villages
Apart from the town of Olesno, Gmina Olesno contains the villages and settlements of Bodzanowice, Borki Małe, Borki Wielkie, Boroszów, Broniec, Grodzisko, Kolonia Łomnicka, Kucoby, Leśna, Łomnica, Łowoszów, Sowczyce, Stare Olesno, Świercze, Wachów, Wachowice, Wojciechów and Wysoka.

Neighbouring gminas
Gmina Olesno is bordered by the gminas of Ciasna, Dobrodzień, Gorzów Śląski, Kluczbork, Krzepice, Lasowice Wielkie, Przystajń, Radłów and Zębowice.

Twin towns – sister cities

Gmina Olesno is twinned with:
 Arnsberg, Germany
 Zalakaros, Hungary

References

Olesno
Gmina Olesno